HD 168625 (V4030 Sagittarii) is a blue hypergiant star and candidate luminous blue variable located in the constellation of Sagittarius easy to see with amateur telescopes. It forms a visual pair with the also blue hypergiant (and luminous blue variable) HD 168607 and is located to the south-east of M17, the Omega Nebula.

Distance

Physical characteristics 

Nebula
The most notable characteristic of HD 168625 is the presence of a nebula surrounding it that was discovered in 1994 and that has been studied with the help of several instruments and observatories and telescopes that include among others the Hubble Space Telescope and the VLT.

Said studies show that HD 168625 is actually surrounded by two nebulae: an inner one that has an elliptical shape and a very complex structure that includes arcs and filaments, and a much larger outer one discovered with the help of the Spitzer Space Telescope that has a bipolar shape and that looks like a clone of the one surrounding Sanduleak -69° 202, the progenitor of the supernova 1987A in the Large Magellanic Cloud. This suggests Sanduleak −69° 202 was also a luminous blue variable as well as the possibility of HD 168625 exploding as a Type II supernova in the near future.

East-north-east of the star and nebula is HD 168701 (HIP 90001), an eclipsing binary of beta Lyrae type. It is at about six times the angular separation of HD 168607 viewed from the solar system and is the third very bright point to the south-east of the nebula.

References 

B-type hypergiants
Luminous blue variables
Sagittarius (constellation)
168625
Sagittarii, V4030
089963
Durchmusterung objects
Alpha Cygni variables